The following are the list of soundtracks for the animated television series Steven Universe created by Rebecca Sugar for Cartoon Network. Sugar also wrote the songs and musical numbers for the series, which are produced by the Dutch musician duo Aivi & Surasshu and jointly composed the title and ending themes for the series. The original soundtrack for the series, featuring a collection of songs were released in two volumes: Vol.1, featuring the musical numbers from the first four seasons, were released on June 2, 2017 and Vol. 2, featuring songs from the fifth season, released on April 12, 2019. The original score from each seasons in the series, were released into separate albums during MaySeptember 2020. Both the soundtracks and score albums were released by Turner Music Publishing, Cartoon Network, and WaterTower Music.

Soundtrack albums

Volume 1 

The soundtrack to Steven Universe was announced on April 12, 2017 with the first volume being set for release on a later date. In a Facebook live event hosted by Cartoon Network, the duo Aivi & Surasshu, performed few songs from the series and announced the release of the soundtrack for the first volume, Steven Universe, Vol. 1 (Original Soundtrack) on June 2.

Track listing

Reception 
A review from the Geekiary magazine, stated "Since its inception, music has been at the core of Steven Universe. Built on a background of musical theater, with leitmotifs and fusion dances written into the very fabric of the show’s lore and mythology, the show has delighted viewers with its wonderful music. Steven Universe Soundtrack Volume 1 is a collection of practically every single song from the show’s first four seasons, and is a must have for any dedicated fan." Epicstream commented the musical songs, "a treat for any lover of musical cartoons" and praised the technical production and background music. Player One magazine wrote "Steven Universe’s music has a combination of easy listening and boppy sci-fi touches that make it really pleasant to listen to".

Forces of Geek wrote the soundtrack "excels on all levels". David King of Bubble Blabber wrote "Next to the more modern animated shows such as Adventure Time, Star Vs the Forces of Evil, Gravity Falls, Legend of Korra and RWBY, Steven Universe has always been on-par with those shows in terms of quality & emotional writing and the combined efforts of Rebecca’s writing and the voice cast’s musical talents further excels as this Vol.1 soundtrack captures the most memorable & iconic tunes of the past four seasons."

Charts

Weekly charts

Year-end charts

Vinyl edition 
In March 2018, a vinyl edition of the soundtrack was published by Iam8bit production company, that featured all the songs from the four seasons, into separate vinyl editions of the release. The set has four discs of 10 inch, with different colors, representing the titular character and the Crystal Gems (Garnet, Amethyst, Pearl) and center labels packed in a gatefold jacket. The edition also featured a special poster and artwork designed and illustrated by Chromosphere. The vinyl edition was released on March 9, 2018.

Volume 2 

The track list of Steven Universe, Vol. 2 (Original Soundtrack) was released on April 9, 2019, with the official soundtrack releasing three days later.

Track listing

Charts

Karaoke edition 

Steven Universe (Karaoke), an album featuring the Karaoke version of the songs featured in the series, were released along with the Vol. 2 soundtrack on April 12, 2019.

Score albums 
The original score for all the five seasons, were released individually for each season on May 29, June 26, July 31, August 28, and September 25, 2020, respectively.

First season

Second season

Third season

Fourth season

Fifth season

References 

2017 soundtrack albums
2019 soundtrack albums
2020 soundtrack albums
Pop soundtracks
Rock soundtracks
Punk rock soundtracks
Contemporary R&B soundtracks
Cartoon Network albums
WaterTower Music soundtracks
Steven Universe